Meryl Streep is an American actress who has had an extensive career in film, television, and stage. She made her stage debut in 1975 with The Public Theater production of Trelawny of the 'Wells'. She went on to perform several roles on stage in the 1970s, gaining a Tony Award nomination for her role in 27 Wagons Full of Cotton (1976). In 1977, Streep starred in the television movie The Deadliest Season, and made her film debut with a brief role alongside Jane Fonda in Julia. A supporting role in the war drama The Deer Hunter (1978) proved to be a breakthrough for Streep; she received her first Academy Award nomination for it. She won the award the following year for playing a troubled wife in the top-grossing drama Kramer vs. Kramer (1979). In 1978, Streep played a German woman married to a Jewish man in Nazi Germany in the television miniseries Holocaust, which earned her the Primetime Emmy Award for Outstanding Lead Actress in a Miniseries or a Movie.

Streep established herself as a leading Hollywood actress in the 1980s. She played dual roles in the period drama The French Lieutenant's Woman (1981), and starred as a Polish Holocaust survivor in Sophie's Choice (1982). She was awarded the Best Actress Oscar for the latter. Streep portrayed the real-life character of Karen Silkwood in Mike Nichols' drama Silkwood (1983), before starring in her most financially successful release of the decade, the romantic drama Out of Africa (1985), in which she played the Danish writer Karen Blixen.With intermittent successes, Streep's career went through a period of relative decline post-1985, with several commentators criticizing her inclination towards melodramatic roles. The criticism continued despite her attempts to star in commercial comedies, films that parodied women's beauty and aging, She-Devil (1989) and Death Becomes Her (1992).

In 1995, Streep starred opposite Clint Eastwood as an unhappily married woman in The Bridges of Madison County, her biggest critical and commercial success of the decade. Although her dramas of the late 1990s received a mixed reception overall, she was praised for her role as a cancer patient in One True Thing (1998). She had acclaimed roles in the 2002 films Adaptation. and The Hours, and won a second Emmy Award for the television miniseries Angels in America a year later, though she failed to replicate her earlier success. This changed in 2006, with an Academy Award-nominated role as a ruthless fashion magazine editor in the comedy-drama The Devil Wears Prada. This late-period success led to starring roles in several high-profile films, including the US$609 million-grossing romantic comedy Mamma Mia! (2008), her highest-grossing release, and the comedy-drama Julie & Julia (2009), in which she played Julia Child. These roles re-established Streep's stardom in Hollywood. Her portrayal of Margaret Thatcher in the biopic The Iron Lady (2011) earned her another Academy Award for Best Actress. The starring role of Katharine Graham in the 2017 drama The Post gained Streep her 21st Oscar nomination, more than any actor or actress in history.

Film

Television

Theatre

See also
 List of awards and nominations received by Meryl Streep

Footnotes

References

Bibliography

External links
 
 
 

Meryl Streep
Actress filmographies
American filmographies